Hee Man: Master of None is a 1985 Filipino fantasy film directed by Tony Y. Reyes and starring Redford White as the titular character.  This movie is a parody of American action fantasy animated series, He-Man and the Masters of the Universe which aired from 1983-1985.

Plot
Hee-Man is a Filipino superhero who grew up as an ordinary native named Herman (Redford White) guided by a deaf-mute man Dila (Don Pepot), not knowing that he is a prince who has superpowers to defeat their enemies. As he grows looking for his parents, he meets Bato (Maning Bato), who was a former fellow of his parents - King Artuz (Mario Montenegro) and Queen Guadalupe. Bato told him everything and his mission to defend the people against the black forces headed by Black Tengko.

Cast
Redford White as Hee Man/Herman
Roderick Paulate
Emily Loren
Don Pepot as Dila
Maning Bato as Bato
Ernie Ortega
Joaquin Fajardo
Mario Escudero as King Artuz
Rachel Sayson
Boyet Argame
Raquel Sayson
Rene Tupaz
Vivian Foz
Pong Pong
Jing Caparas
Boy Ranay
Imelda Caparas

Box office
The film was the top-grossing film of 1985, grossing some P 25.5 million.

References

External links

http://video48.blogspot.com/2010/08/1985-metro-manila-film-festival.html
http://www.superheroeslives.com/independents/hee-man_master_of_none_(1985).htm
https://web.archive.org/web/20121005130322/http://www.mmda.gov.ph/mmff/

1985 films
1985 fantasy films
Filipino-language films
Philippine fantasy films
Tagalog-language films
Films directed by Tony Y. Reyes